Rukavička is a 1941 Czechoslovak film starring Josef Kemr.

References

External links
 

1941 films
1940s Czech-language films
Czechoslovak romantic comedy films
Czech romantic comedy films
Czechoslovak black-and-white films
1941 romantic comedy films
1940s Czech films